Apollon Marie-Rose Barret (1804–1879) was born in France and was Professor of oboe at the Royal Academy of Music in London.

In 1850 he published his Complete Method for the Oboe that has been widely used by oboe teachers around the world ever since.

External links 
 
 Barret, Apollon Marie-Rose on IMSLP
 Apollon Marie-Rose on IdRef
 Apollon Marie-Rose Barret: Melody #5-Duet on YouTube

French classical oboists
Male oboists
1804 births
1879 deaths
19th-century classical musicians
19th-century French male musicians